Harry Devlin is the name of

 Harry Devlin (1918 – 2001), American artist and painter
 Harry Devlin (athlete) (fl. 1904), American marathon runner
 Harry Devlin (fictional detective), character created by Martin Edwards